Lemuel Ellsworth (1836–1898) was a member of the Wisconsin State Assembly.

Biography
Ellsworth was born on December 27, 1836, in Esopus, New York. He moved to Milwaukee, Wisconsin, in 1857. On January 2, 1860, Ellsworth married Helen "Nellie" Lucinda Jones (1841–1881). They would have four children. Ellsworth died September 4, 1898, in Milwaukee.

Career
Ellsworth was a member of the Assembly during the 1875 and 1876 sessions. Additionally, he was elected County Treasurer of Milwaukee County, Wisconsin, in 1873 and 1880. He was a Republican.

References

External links
Links To The Past

1836 births
1898 deaths
People from Esopus, New York
Politicians from Milwaukee
Republican Party members of the Wisconsin State Assembly
County treasurers in Wisconsin
19th-century American politicians